John Edward "Jack" Cunningham III (born March 27, 1931) is a former Republican U.S. Representative from Washington's seventh district for one term from 1977 to 1979.

Biography 
Prior to his service in the U.S. House, Cunningham served in the Washington House of Representatives from 1973 to 1975, and after that in the Washington Senate from 1975 to 1977. He served in the United States Air Force Reserve in 1953 and 1954. Cunningham lived in Des Moines, Washington.

Congress 
Cunningham was elected as a Republican to the seventh district vacancy in a special election when U.S. Representative Brock Adams resigned to become Secretary of Transportation. However his victory in this liberal district was more the result of confusion with Adams's resignation. Cunningham lost reelection in 1978, and served from May 17, 1977 – January 3, 1979.

References

Biographical Directory of the United States Congress

Republican Party Washington (state) state senators
Republican Party members of the Washington House of Representatives
1931 births
Living people
Politicians from Chicago
People from Des Moines, Washington
Military personnel from Illinois
Businesspeople from Washington (state)
Seattle University alumni
University of San Francisco alumni
Republican Party members of the United States House of Representatives from Washington (state)